General Owens may refer to:

Donald L. Owens (1930–2012), Arizona Air National Guard commanding general
Ira C. Owens (born 1936), U.S. Army lieutenant general
Robert G. Owens Jr. (1917–2007), U.S. Marine Corps major general

See also
General Owen (disambiguation)